Lea-Jasmin Riecke (born 25 April 2000) is a German athlete who won the 2018 IAAF World U20 Championships in the long jump.

Career
Lea-Jasmin Riecke won the silver medal at the German Youth All-Around Championships in Lage in 2015 . She won gold in the 4 x 200m relay at the German Youth Indoor Championships in Dortmund in 2016 and took part in the 2016 European Youth Championships in Tbilisi.

In 2017 she became German U18 long jump champion at the German Youth Championships in Ulm with a distance of 6.19m. She then won the gold medal in the long jump at the 2018 IAAF World U20 Championships in Tampere with a personal best 6.51m. At the German Youth Championships in 2018 in Rostock she gained gold medals in the long jump with 6.34m jump and in the 4x100m relay from. That year the German Sports Foundation nominated for the Junior Sportswoman of the Year.

At the German Youth Championships 2019 in Ulm, she won the gold medal with 6.43m jump. Then she won the bronze medal at the German Championships in Berlin.

After missing huge chunks of competition time in 2021 Riecke claimed third place at the German indoor championships long jump competition in Leipzig in February 2022, jumping 6.26m to finish behind Merle Homeier and long jump Olympic champion Malaika Mihambo.

References

2000 births
Living people
German female long jumpers
German female athletes